Fort Thompson was a military post established during the Second Seminole War along the Caloosahatchee River in Florida. The fort was named for Lt. Colonel Alexander Thompson, who was killed in the Battle of Okeechobee in 1837.

The property was acquired by Francis Asbury Hendry who used it for cattle ranching. It preceded LaBelle, Florida.

The settlement of Caloosahatchee was built around the fort, with a population of 13 in 1870.

The Fort Thompson Hotel was named for the fort. It was managed by Everett Edward Goodno. LaBelle has a Fort Thompson Avenue.

Henry Ford acquired the Fort Thompson property and used it as an experimental rubber plantation.

The Fort Thompson Formation is a geological feature in the area. A historical marker commemorates Fort Thompson's history.

See also
 Fort Denaud, Florida

References

Hendry County, Florida